The 2011–12 season was Ayr United's first season back in the Scottish First Division, having been promoted from the Scottish Second Division at the end of the 2010–11 season. Ayr also competed in the Challenge Cup, League Cup and the Scottish Cup.

Summary
Ayr United finished ninth in the First Division,  entering the play-offs losing 3–1 to Airdrie United on aggregate in the Semi-final and were relegated to the Second Division. They reached the Quarter-final of the Challenge Cup, the Semi-final of the League Cup and the Quarter-final of the Scottish Cup.

Results and fixtures

Pre-season

Scottish First Division

First Division play-offs

Scottish League Cup

Scottish Cup

Scottish Challenge Cup

|}Last updated: 11 August 2011Source: The Scottish Football League

Player statistics

Captains

Squad statistics
Last updated 13 May 2012

|}
a.  Includes other competitive competitions, including the play-offs and the 2011–12 Scottish Challenge Cup.

Disciplinary record

Includes all competitive matches.

Last updated 13 May 2012

Team stats

League table

Results by round

Club

Coaching staff
{|class="wikitable"
|-
!Position
!Staff
|-
|Manager|| Brian Reid
|-
|Assistant First Team Manager|| Scott Mackenzie
|-
|First Team Fitness Coach|| David Johnston
|-
|Groundsman|| David Harkness

Other information

|-

|-

Transfers

In 

Total spending:  £0 million

Out 

Total Income:  £0.00 million

Expenditure:  £0.00 million

References

Ayr United
Ayr United F.C. seasons